Les Essarts-le-Vicomte is a commune in the Marne department in north-eastern France.

Geography
The river Aubetin has its source in the commune.

See also
Communes of the Marne department

References

Essartslevicomte